BRI 1335-0417 is the most distant known spiral galaxy, as of 2021. It is located in the Virgo constellation. The galaxy has a redshift of 4.4, meaning its light took 12.4 billion years to reach Earth, when the universe was 1.4 billion years old, and its present comoving distance is about 25 billion light-years. It is discovered by ALMA, led by Takafumi Tsukui and his colleague, professor Satoru Iguchi from SOKENDAI, and the National Astronomical Observatory of Japan, in May 2021.

See also
 BX442, an old and distant spiral galaxy
 A1689B11, another old and distant spiral galaxy

External links
  on SIMBAD

References

Spiral galaxies
Virgo (constellation)
Dwarf spiral galaxies
Astronomical objects discovered in 2021